South Van Horn is a census-designated place (CDP) in the Fairbanks North Star Borough, Alaska, United States. At the 2010 census the population was 558, the 107th largest city or CDP in Alaska. It has a population density of 65.42 people per sq mi (25.26 per km2).

Geography

Demographics

South Van Horn has a median age of 42.4, with a married population of 49.3%. The average household has 2.51 people. The unemployment rate is 5.5% and the median household income is $39,883.

References

Census-designated places in Fairbanks North Star Borough, Alaska